24th CFCA Awards
December 19, 2011

Best Film: 
 The Tree of Life 

The 24th Chicago Film Critics Association Awards, honoring the best in film for 2011, were announced on December 19, 2011.

Winners and nominees

Best Actor
Michael Shannon – Take Shelter
 George Clooney – The Descendants
 Jean Dujardin – The Artist
 Michael Fassbender – Shame
 Gary Oldman – Tinker Tailor Soldier Spy

Best Actress
Michelle Williams – My Week with Marilyn
 Kirsten Dunst – Melancholia
 Elizabeth Olsen – Martha Marcy May Marlene
 Anna Paquin – Margaret
 Meryl Streep – The Iron Lady

Best Animated Film
Rango
 The Adventures of Tintin: The Secret of the Unicorn
 Arthur Christmas
 Puss in Boots
 Winnie the Pooh

Best Cinematography
The Tree of Life – Emmanuel Lubezki Drive – Newton Thomas Sigel
 Hugo – Robert Richardson
 Melancholia – Manuel Alberto Claro
 War Horse – Janusz Kamiński

Best DirectorTerrence Malick – The Tree of Life
 Michel Hazanavicius – The Artist
 Alexander Payne – The Descendants
 Martin Scorsese – Hugo
 Nicolas Winding Refn – Drive

Best Documentary Film
The Interrupters
 Cave of Forgotten Dreams
 Into the Abyss
 Pina
 Project Nim
 Tabloid

Best Film
The Tree of Life
 The Artist
 The Descendants
 Drive
 Hugo

Best Foreign Language Film
A Separation, Iran
 In a Better World, Denmark/Sweden
 Incendies, Canada
 The Skin I Live In, Spain
 Uncle Boonmee Who Can Recall His Past Lives, Thailand

Best Original Score
Drive – Cliff Martinez The Artist – Ludovic Bource
 The Girl with the Dragon Tattoo – Trent Reznor and Atticus Ross
 Hanna – The Chemical Brothers
 Hugo – Howard Shore

Best Screenplay – AdaptedMoneyball – Steven Zaillian and Aaron Sorkin The Descendants – Alexander Payne, Nat Faxon and Jim Rash
 Drive – Hossein Amini
 Hugo – John Logan
 Tinker Tailor Soldier Spy – Bridget O'Connor and Peter Straughan

Best Screenplay – OriginalThe Artist – Michel Hazanavicius Martha Marcy May Marlene – Sean Durkin
 Midnight in Paris – Woody Allen
 A Separation – Asghar Farhadi
 The Tree of Life – Terrence Malick

Best Supporting ActorAlbert Brooks – Drive
 Nick Nolte – Warrior
 Patton Oswalt – Young Adult
 Brad Pitt – The Tree of Life
 Christopher Plummer – Beginners

Best Supporting Actress
Jessica Chastain – The Tree of Life
 Melissa McCarthy – Bridesmaids
 Carey Mulligan – Shame
 Octavia Spencer – The Help
 Shailene Woodley – The Descendants

Most Promising Filmmaker
Sean Durkin – Martha Marcy May Marlene
 J. C. Chandor – Margin Call
 Simon Curtis – My Week with Marilyn
 Drake Doremus – Like Crazy
 Tate Taylor – The Help

Most Promising Performer
Elizabeth Olsen – Martha Marcy May Marlene
 Liana Liberato – Trust
 Brit Marling – Another Earth
 Hunter McCracken – The Tree of Life
 Shailene Woodley – The Descendants

References
 Tree of Life Leads CFCA Nominations with 7; Descendants, Drive Follow with 6 chicagofilmcritics.org
 Chicago Film Critics Nominations AwardsDaily
 CFCA Names Tree of Life Best Picture chicagofilmcritics.org

External links
 chicagofilmcritics.org

 2011
2011 film awards
December 2011 events in the United States

fr:23e cérémonie des Chicago Film Critics Association Awards